Aleksei Ivanovich Mamykin (29 February 1936 – 20 September 2011) was a Soviet football player and Russian coach.

Honours

Club
Dynamo Moscow
 Soviet Top League: 1957

International career
Mamykin made his debut for USSR on 10 September 1961 in a friendly against Austria. He played at the 1962 FIFA World Cup and scored a goal in a group game against Uruguay (he scored a hat-trick against Uruguay earlier that same year in a friendly).

International goals
Scores and results table. Soviet Union's goal tally first:

Career statistics

International

References

External links
  Profile

1936 births
2011 deaths
People from Ryazan Oblast
Russian footballers
Soviet footballers
Soviet Union international footballers
1962 FIFA World Cup players
Soviet Top League players
FC Dynamo Moscow players
PFC CSKA Moscow players
FC SKA Rostov-on-Don players
SC Odesa players
Russian football managers
Soviet football managers
SC Odesa managers
PFC CSKA Moscow managers
FC CSKA Kyiv managers
Association football forwards
Sportspeople from Ryazan Oblast